Lifting Shadows is a 1920 American silent drama film directed by Léonce Perret and starring Emmy Wehlen, Stuart Holmes and Wyndham Standing.

Cast
 Emmy Wehlen as Vania
 Stuart Holmes as Clifford Howard
 Wyndham Standing as Hugh Mason
 Julia Swayne Gordon as Countess Vera Lobanoff
 F. French as Gregory Lobanoff
 Rafael Bongini as Serge Ostrowski

References

Bibliography
 Michael Slade Shull. Radicalism in American Silent Films, 1909-1929: A Filmography and History. McFarland, 2015.

External links
 

1920 films
1920 drama films
1920s English-language films
American silent feature films
Silent American drama films
Pathé Exchange films
American black-and-white films
Films directed by Léonce Perret
1920s American films